The 1932 season of the Primera División Peruana, was the 17th season of top-flight Peruvian football. A total of eight teams competed in this league. The national champions were Alianza Lima. No relegated team, because First Division grew to 10 teams for 1933.

 Atlético Chalaco, Atlético Frigorífico and Unión Buenos Aires leave the League to form the Liga Provincial del Callao.
 Hidroaviación disappeared after losing the support of the Escuela de Hidroaviación de Ancón.
 Lawn Tennis decided to disenroll from the Peruvian Football Federation.

Format 
 From 1931 until 1934 the results of a reserve teams league were added as bonus points.
 From 1931 until 1942 the points system was W:3, D:2, L:1, walkover:0.

Results

Standings

External links 
 Peru 1932 season at RSSSF
 Peruvian Football League News 

Peru1
Peruvian Primera División seasons
1932 in Peruvian football